UTV Movies was a short-lived Canadian Hindi language specialty television channel that was owned by Asian Television Network and SoundView Entertainment. It broadcast Hindi-language programming from UTV Movies and Canadian content.

UTV Movies broadcast Bollywood films from various genres from the UTV library and other studios. It also aired other film related content such as interviews with actors and documentaries.

History
In February 2010, SoundView Entertainment Inc. was granted approval by the Canadian Radio-television and Telecommunications Commission (CRTC) to launch  UTV Movies, described at the time as "a national niche third-language ethnic Category 2 specialty programming service devoted to feature films, made-for-TV movies, actor interviews, documentaries and similar movie-related programming."

The channel launched on December 2, 2011, initially on Rogers Cable. The channel abruptly ceased broadcasting in December 2012.

References

External links
 UTV Movies India

Digital cable television networks in Canada
Movie channels in Canada
Television channels and stations established in 2011
2011 establishments in Canada
Television channels and stations disestablished in 2012
2012 disestablishments in Canada
UTV Software Communications
Hindi-language television in Canada